Quercus kinabaluensis is a species of oak endemic to the mountains of Borneo. It is placed in Quercus subgenus Cerris, section Cyclobalanopsis.

Range and habitat
Quercus kinabaluensis is found in a limited area of the mountains of northern Borneo, including on Mount Kinabalu, in Sabah state of Malaysia. It grows in montane tropical rain forest on basic soils from 457 to 2,438 metres elevation.

References

kinabaluensis
Flora of Sabah
Plants described in 1968
Flora of the Borneo montane rain forests
Flora of Mount Kinabalu